Federico Michael Gaytan (born August 7, 1995), better known as Fedmyster (stylized in all caps), is an American Twitch streamer and YouTuber. He is best known for his gaming and IRL live streams on Twitch. He is a former member of OfflineTV, an online social entertainment group of content creators.

Early life 
Gaytan was born in 1995 to Mexican American parents. He grew up with a brother in the Los Angeles area and attended the University of California, Santa Cruz.

Career 
Gaytan was a full-time video editor and YouTube Manager for content creator Christian "IWDominate" Rivera, a former pro player for Team Liquid. He stopped editing for Rivera when he was invited to join OfflineTV as an editor in June 2017. He would later solely direct, produce, and manage all of their content. On July 8, 2017, he published his first YouTube video with the group, where he was formally introduced as the group's editor. He was named as talent in January 2018 and was added to the OfflineTV streamer roster.

Twitch 
Gaytan began his streaming career in early January 2018, after transitioning from being the editor for OfflineTV. In the same year, his Twitch emote called "Fed7" had been used a reported 431 million times in three months, making it the most popular emote on the site at that time.

Ban history 
Gaytan has been banned by Twitch on several occasions since he began streaming. His first ban occurred on November 28, 2017, where he was banned for photoshopping cleavage onto pictures of his roommates Imane "Pokimane" Anys and Lily "LilyPichu" Ki for a YouTube video thumbnail. The ban lasted 24 hours. He was banned a second time in May 2018 after he filmed a business card with personal information during an IRL stream. This ban lasted three days. Gaytan received another ban in July 2018 after a racist donation message was read out on his broadcast via text-to-speech software. The duration of this third ban was seven days.

A fourth ban followed in April 2019, over a week after an intoxicated Gaytan had damaged a vending kiosk during a live stream in Tokyo, Japan. He received and served a 14-day ban for destruction of property.

FEDMYSTER2 was temporarily banned on May 1, 2020, after Gaytan accidentally showed a glimpse of a partially nude picture of Twitch streamer Natalia "Alinity" Mogollon while scrolling on Twitter. The ban, originally set for three days, was overturned after Gaytan appealed it to Twitch staff. 

On May 8, 2020, Gaytan's Twitch emote FedSimp, his portrayal of the Internet slang term simp, was taken down on the grounds of targeted harassment and bullying. Although he claimed, "My community never used it with ill intent," and, "It was mostly banter and, in some cases, a compliment. Really unfortunate... One of my favorite emotes," the spamming of this emote on another streamer's channel led to it being taken down.

In April 2022, Gaytan's main Twitch channel was banned for eight days following a hack during which those responsible advertised a cryptocurrency scam. Other targets of the hackers included his YouTube channel and those of the late Reckful, former esports athlete super and Fortnite players Vermax and McCreamy.

Misconduct allegations
On June 27, 2020, fellow OfflineTV members Yvonne "yvonnie" Ng and Lily “LilyPichu” Ki came forward with sexual misconduct allegations involving Gaytan. Ng stated that on two separate instances, Gaytan would enter her room uninvited, lay down on her bed, and begin inappropriately touching her. Ki stated that Gaytan would also enter her room uninvited and make inappropriate advances on her. These allegations resulted in Gaytan's immediate removal from the group. The situation was further elaborated on by Anys, wherein she discussed that he had also made advances on her personal life and fueled growing distrust between the two. Anys also conveyed how the situation with Gaytan contributed the most to her leaving the OfflineTV house. In addition, she outlined how a group of eight other close female friends of OfflineTV, along with members of the group itself, had an intervention with Gaytan, where each relayed specific instances where he had made them feel uncomfortable. She mentioned that while he had seemed extremely apologetic during the intervention, immediately following it he began to contact others not involved, saying that the situation was exaggerated and that he was not at fault. CNN called this situation "one of [the] biggest #MeToo moments" of the gaming world.

On November 24, 2020, a 25-page statement by Gaytan titled "my truth" was leaked, which alleged that much of the situation was exaggerated to form a false narrative against him. Gaytan specifically cited a story where Anys claimed that he had attempted to have Ng fired after she refused advances from him; he refuted this allegation and instead claimed that Anys had wanted to fire Ng much earlier as conveyed in text messages presented in the statement. Anys addressed the leaked document on stream the next day by reading and responding to each section, conveying the situation in her point of view, but stressing that neither had ill will for the other. Gaytan later responded to the leak by stating that the statement was made months ago and that although they disagreed on some aspects, they eventually decided to keep it hidden and move on, and that the statement being leaked was unintentional and undesired for both of them.

See also 
OfflineTV

References 

1995 births
Living people
American people of Mexican descent
American YouTubers
Gaming YouTubers
Let's Players
Male bloggers
Twitch (service) streamers
Video bloggers
Video game commentators
YouTube controversies